This is a list of Canadian television related events from 1995.

Events

Debuts

Ending this year

Television shows

1950s
Country Canada (1954–2007)
Hockey Night in Canada (1952–present)
The National (1954–present).

1960s
CTV National News (1961–present)
Land and Sea (1964–present)
Man Alive (1967–2000)
Mr. Dressup (1967–1996)
The Nature of Things (1960–present, scientific documentary series)
Question Period (1967–present, news program)
W-FIVE (1966–present, newsmagazine program)

1970s
Canada AM (1972–present, news program)
the fifth estate (1975–present, newsmagazine program)
Marketplace (1972–present, newsmagazine program)
100 Huntley Street (1977–present, religious program)

1980s
Adrienne Clarkson Presents (1988–1999)
CityLine (1987–present, news program)
Fashion File (1989–2009)
Fred Penner's Place (1985–1997)
Just For Laughs (1988–present)
Midday (1985–2000)
On the Road Again (1987–2007)
Road to Avonlea (1989–1996)
Venture (1985–2007)

1990s
 Are You Afraid of the Dark? (1990–1996)
 Comics! (1993–1999)
 Due South (1994–1999)
 Madison (1993–1997)
 North of 60 (1992–1997)
 The Passionate Eye (1993–present)
 Ready or Not (1993–1997)
 Royal Canadian Air Farce (1993–2008)
 Side Effects (1994–1996)
 The Red Green Show (1991–2006)
 This Hour Has 22 Minutes (1993–present)
 Witness (1992–2004)

TV movies

Television stations

Network affiliation changes

References

See also
 1995 in Canada
 List of Canadian films of 1995